Reconciliation: The Peacekeeping Monument is a monument in Ottawa, the capital of Canada, commemorating Canada's role in international peacekeeping and the soldiers who have participated and are currently participating, both living and dead.

It is located between St. Patrick Street and Murray Street, in the centre of the intersection where they meet Mackenzie Avenue and Sussex Drive; this places it just south of the National Gallery of Canada and just north of the American Embassy and Major's Hill Park. Artist Jack Harman built the three soldiers with architects Richard and Gregory Henriquez designing the site concept and monument  structures. Cornelia Oberlander was the landscape architect. The monument was completed in 1992.

The work, entitled Reconciliation, depicts three peacekeeping soldiers — two men and a woman — standing on two ridges of stone which cut through the broken debris of war and converge at a high point, which symbolizes the resolution which peacekeeping brings.  The base of the monument includes Lester Pearson's 1956 quote "We need action not only to end the fighting but to make the peace... My own government would be glad to recommend Canadian participation in such a United Nations force, a truly international peace and police force", as well as the French translation.

In 1995, the Monument was commemorated on the year's $1 coin, following the 1994 commemoration of the National War Memorial.

See also

 Canadian Tomb of the Unknown Soldier
 National War Memorial (Canada)
 The Ottawa Memorial

References

National Capital Commission - Reconciliation: The Peacekeeping Monument

Gough, P.J. (2002) ‘Invicta Pax’  Monuments, Memorials and Peace ; an analysis of the Canadian Peacekeeping Monument, Ottawa, International Journal of Heritage Studies, 8, 3. pp. 201–223, ISSN 1352-7258.

Canadian military memorials and cemeteries
Monuments and memorials in Ottawa
Military history of Canada
Peace monuments and memorials